Vágs Bóltfelag (VB) is a Faroese handball club. It started as a football club, which was founded on 5 June 1905, but later the sport handball became a part of the club. The handball club is based in Vágur in Suðuroy. They play their home matches in the sports hall, Vágshøll on Eiðinum in Vágur. The football club is now known as FC Suðuroy.

Women's handball 
VB was earlier a handball club for men and women. But since the football competition was changed, so it now starts earlier and ends later, it is not possible anymore, or at least very difficult, for the same person to play both handball and football. So now the handball in Vágur is mostly for women and football is mostly for the men, in the best divisions anyway, the men have a team in the second best division. The population is only 1400, there are not enough people to get good teams in both sports for both genders in such a small village. The women's best division was called 1. deild until 2005 when they changed the name for sponsor reasons to Sunset kappingin or Sunsetdeildin.

Honours 
The VB handball team has won the Faroese Championships three times: 1950, 2003 and 2005.

Team 
The current squad as of February 2013

Foreign players 
Over the last decade it has become normal for Faroese handball clubs as well football clubs, to import foreign players in order to improve the team. This is also the fact regarding VB. In 2004 the Football club signed 22-year-old Lithuanian International, Mindaugas Grigalevičius. In 1996 Tomislav Sivić became player/manager for the football team, when he first came to Faroe Islands. The team was coached by another young foreign player/manager, Krzysztof Popczyński, from 1998 to 2001. Most of the foreign players who played for VB were from Eastern Europe, as well as some from Denmark, Iceland and Africa. Although like other football clubs in the Faroe Islands, the large majority of players in the squad were Faroese.

In 2010 the Handball team made an agreement with three players from Lithuania.
In 2011 two players from Serbia are playing handball with VB, Na and one player, the goal keeper, comes from Lithuania.

The football club 
The VB football team was founded on 5 June 1905. 90 years later, in 1995, the club merged with Sumba to form Sumba/VB, although the merger only lasted a single season. 10 years later, in 2005, there was a second merger between VB Vágur and Sumba, and formed VB/Sumba, which later had its name changed to FC Suðuroy. Other divisions of FC Suðuroy play some of their home games in Sumba at the á Krossinum Stadium.

Honours 
Faroe Islands Premier League: 1
 2000
Faroe Islands Cup: 1
 1974

VB in Europe 
 1Q = 1st Qualifying Round

Managers

 Tomislav Sivić (1996)
 Krzysztof Popczyński (1998–01)

References

External links 
 FCSuduroy.com The current website of FC Suðuroy
 HSF.fo, The Faroe Islands Handball Association

Faroese handball clubs
Association football clubs established in 1905
Defunct football clubs in the Faroe Islands
1905 establishments in the Faroe Islands
Sport in Vágur
VB Vágur